Svyazi a Russian pop punk band founded by, songstress, a woman of writer and musicant Yuki Kislyak. (Юки Кисляк).

Biography
The group "Svyazi" (Группа Связи) was born in 2013 with the debut video "Umeret', kak v romane". In 2014–2015, “Svyazi” became nominees for the annual national award “Strana”. After that, the group released their debut album and presented it in Moscow, and the clips of the group "Svyazi" appeared on the air of the federal music channels. In 2017, "Svyazi" Group became a laureate of the "New Energy" international festival. In February 2019, the group released a new single "Sex" (Секс) which quickly became popular on the internet. At the moment, the Svyazi group, together with the music label Soyuz Music, is working on the release of a new album called "Imya moyo" (Имя моё), which is scheduled for release on January 31, 2020.

Discography

 2015 - Жажда (ZHazhda, Thirst) - album
 2016 - Бонни и Клайд (Bonni i Klajd, Bonnie and Сlyde) - single
 2019 - Секс (Seks, Sex) - single
 2020 - Имя моё (Imya moyo, My name) - album

Clippiography

 2013 - Умереть, как в романе (Umeret', kak v romane, To die, as in the novel) 
 2014 - Игра (Igra, A game) 
 2015 - Рассветы (Rassvety, Sunrises)
 2016 - Бонни и Клайд (Bonni i Klajd, Bonnie and Сlyde)

References

External links 
 Official group Svyazi VK on VK (service)
 Official page group Svyazi on Instagram
 Official Channel group Svyazi on YouTube
 

Russian rock music groups
Russian pop rock music groups
Musical groups established in 2013
Russian alternative rock groups
2013 establishments in Russia